Sergey Aleksandrovich Khizhnichenko (born 17 July 1991) is a Kazakh football player.

Career

Club career
Khizhnichenko began his career in 2006 with FC Vostok and in January 2008 he was promoted to the senior team.
In November 2010 and January 2011, Sergey was on trial at Feyenoord.

In December 2014, Khizhnichenko signed a two-year contract with FC Aktobe.

On 23 January 2017, Khizhnichenko signed for FC Shakhtyor Soligorsk in the Belarusian Premier League.

On 6 January 2020, Astana confirmed that Khizhnichenko had left the club after the expiration of his contract.

International career
Khizhnichenko scored his first goals for the national team in a 3–1 win against Andorra on 9 September 2009. He scored twice.

Just over a month later, also in a qualifier, he scored the equaliser against Croatia, only for his side to lose the lead and the match.

Against Georgia in a pre-season friendly, he scored the only goal of the match as Kazakhstan recorded a rare victory. This was his first goal in almost three years playing for the national team.

In the 2018 FIFA World Cup qualifiers, Khizhnichenko scored two goals against Poland to help his team overcome a 2–0 deficit and end the match with a 2-2 draw.

Career statistics

Club

International

Statistics accurate as of match played 18 November 2020

International goals

References

External links
 
 Profile at Football Federation of Kazakhstan
 
 

1991 births
Living people
Sportspeople from Oskemen
Kazakhstani people of Ukrainian descent
Kazakhstani footballers
Association football forwards
Kazakhstan international footballers
Kazakhstan Premier League players
Ekstraklasa players
Kazakhstani expatriate footballers
Expatriate footballers in Poland
Expatriate footballers in Belarus
FC Astana players
FC Atyrau players
FC Vostok players
FC Shakhter Karagandy players
Korona Kielce players
FC Aktobe players
FC Tobol players
FC Shakhtyor Soligorsk players
FC Ordabasy players